The 1978 Avis Rent-a-Car British Open Championships was held at the Wembley Squash Centre in London from 31 March - 8 April 1978. Geoff Hunt won his fifth title defeating Qamar Zaman in the final.

Seeds

Draw and results

Final
 Geoff Hunt beat  Qamar Zaman 7-9 9-1 9-1 9-2

Section 1

Section 2

References

Men's British Open Squash Championships
Men's British Open
Men's British Open Squash Championship
Men's British Open Squash Championship
Men's British Open Squash Championship
Men's British Open Squash Championship
Squash competitions in London